Leslie Darcy Robert Donaldson (30 July 1922 – 8 January 1995) was a Scottish professional footballer who played as an inside-forward. He made appearances in the English Football League with Wrexham, and also played in the Scottish League for Heart of Midlothian and Clyde.

References

1922 births
1995 deaths
Scottish footballers
English Football League players
Heart of Midlothian F.C. players
Clyde F.C. players
Rhyl F.C. players
Wrexham A.F.C. players
Holyhead Town F.C. players
Association football forwards